Ennavalle is a 2000 Indian Tamil-language romance film directed by J. Suresh which stars, R. Madhavan in lead role. Sneha made her acting debut through this movie. The film also featured Manivannan, Thalaivasal Vijay and Charle in pivotal roles, while music was composed by S. A. Rajkumar. The film released on 22 December 2000 to negative reviews from film critics.

Plot
James Vasanthan and his three friends Ganeshan, Charles, and Mohan, have a music troupe that sings at weddings. They are tenants of Subramani whose daughter Lakshmi shares a good rapport with the youths, helping them in their time of need. Her encouragement puts a new zeal in James, who soon gains recognition as a singer. Not that this brings any change in the group's lifestyle, for J. Suresh still shows them as strugglers. James finally proposes to Lakshmi who rejects him, as she has her past to reckon with. She is a divorcee, her husband having abandoned her soon after marriage for his girlfriend. When Lakshmi's friend and neighbour Seetha puts some sense into her, she decides to make amends. But misunderstandings pile up between the lovers – the situations are all forced here – until J. Suresh leads the story to a desired happy ending.

Cast

R. Madhavan as James Vasanthan
Sneha as Lakshmi
Manivannan as Subramani
Charle as Ganeshan
Vaiyapuri as Charles
Venu Madhav as Mohan
Anand as Anand
Thalaivasal Vijay as Neighbour
Venu Arvind as Kumar
Kalairani as Lakshmi's mother
S. N. Lakshmi as Lakshmi's grandmother
Aswini as Seetha
Pandu as First House Owner
K. R. Vatsala
Kathadi Ramamurthy
Narra Venkateswara Rao
Oru Viral Krishna Rao
Crane Manohar
Scissor Manohar
LIC Narasimhan
A. V. Ramanan
Pasi Sathya
Jothi

Production
The director J. Suresh initially approached Mani Ratnam to produce the film, but Mani Ratnam refused the script. He however introduced Suresh to R. Madhavan, who was signed on to play the lead role. The film was tentatively titled as Dhool and then as Sugham, whilst actress Sneha made her debut with the film after calling off schedules for her film, Virumbugiren. Telugu comedian Venu Madhav also made his debut in Tamil films with the project. The film was shot across locations in Chennai, Ooty, Hyderabad and Gopichettipalayam and the filming was completed within 18 days.

Release
The film opened to predominantly negative reviews, with most critics agreeing that Madhavan had taken a wrong career move after the success of Alaipayuthey. The Hindu critic revealed that the "reeks of melodrama bogs down even a natural performer like Madhavan". In regard to performances it claimed that "for Madhavan, it is merely a prosaic exercise in melodrama" while the "new heroine Sneha could have shown more emotions and reactions in certain scene". Another reviewer drew particular criticism for the role of Thalaivasal Vijay, claiming it was "arguably the smallest role in his career". The film subsequently did not perform well at the box office.

Soundtrack

References

External links

2000s Tamil-language films
Films scored by S. A. Rajkumar